Dihammaphora signaticollis' is a species of beetle in the family Cerambycidae. It was described by Chevrolat in 1859.

References

Dihammaphora
Beetles described in 1859